The intervertebral veins accompany the spinal nerves through the intervertebral foramina; they receive the veins from the medulla spinalis, drain the internal and external vertebral plexuses.

Their drainage depends upon the part of the body:
 Neck: vertebral vein
 Thorax: intercostal veins 
 Lumbar region: lumbar veins
 Sacral region: lateral sacral veins

Their orifices are provided with valves.

References

External links

Veins of the torso